David Montero del Río (born 12 March 1985) is a Spanish retired professional footballer who played as a goalkeeper.

Club career
Born in Salamanca, Castile and León, Montero was a youth graduate of local club UD Salamanca. His professional input with the first team, however, consisted of one Segunda División match against Elche CF on 18 June 2004 (15 minutes played, 2–1 away win) and a sole appearance in the Copa del Rey against Burgos CF in September of the following year.

In the summer of 2008, Montero signed with CD Guijuelo also from his native region, after one season with CD Guadalajara also in Segunda División B. On 9 May 2009, he scored from a goal kick to help the visiting team to a 1–1 draw at Real Unión.

On 4 March 2012, against SD Eibar, Montero appeared in his 100th league game for Guijuelo.

References

External links

1985 births
Living people
Sportspeople from Salamanca
Spanish footballers
Footballers from Castile and León
Association football goalkeepers
Segunda División players
Segunda División B players
Tercera División players
UD Salamanca players
CD Guadalajara (Spain) footballers
CD Guijuelo footballers
Spain youth international footballers
21st-century Spanish people